The 1995 Carolina Panthers season was the franchise's inaugural season in the National Football League and the first under head coach Dom Capers. They went 7–9, the best debut year for any expansion franchise since the NFL's inception. The Panthers played their first season's home games at Clemson University because what would become Bank of America Stadium was still under construction after a deadline point in 1995 for scheduling Carolina's first set of NFL games.

Offseason
The Panthers were jokingly called "Buffalo Bills South" because of the large number of former Bills on the roster. Quarterback Frank Reich, wide receiver Don Beebe, tight end Pete Metzelaars and linebacker Carlton Bailey had played key roles in the Bills' run of four consecutive Super Bowls earlier in the 1990s and were on the Panthers' inaugural roster. Furthermore, the team's general manager was longtime Bills GM and executive Bill Polian. (See also the 2001 San Diego Chargers season, in which a similar situation arose when John Butler brought several former Bills with him to San Diego after being fired.)

Expansion draft

^ Made roster.

NFL Draft

Personnel

Staff

Roster

Schedule

Preseason

Regular season

Season summary

Week 7 vs Jets

Players dumped Gatorade on Dom Capers after the win.

Standings

Records
 Most victories by an expansion team (7)
 First expansion team to have a winning record at home (5–3)
 First expansion team to have a four-game winning streak (weeks 7–10)
 First expansion team to defeat a defending Super Bowl champion in its inaugural season (13–7 over the San Francisco 49ers in San Francisco)

References

Carolina Panthers seasons
Carolina Panthers Season, 1995
Carolina